The Baath Dam is a dam on the Euphrates, located  upstream from the city of Raqqa in Raqqa Governorate, Syria. Construction of the dam started in 1983 and was finished in 1986. These irregularities in the flow from the Tabqa Dam are caused by changes in the electricity demand.

Like the Baath Dam, the Tishrin Dam is also functionally related to the Tabqa Dam. Construction of the Tishrin Dam was partly motivated by the disappointing performance of the hydroelectric power station in the Tabqa Dam. Before the Syrian Civil War, Syria had plans to construct a fourth dam – the Halabiye Dam – on the Euphrates, downstream from the Baath Dam. The dam is named after the Syrian Arab Socialist Ba'ath Party.

Syrian Civil War 
On 4 February 2013, opposition forces captured the dam, a week before capturing the Tabqa Dam. The Baath Dam was captured from the ISIL by the Syrian Democratic Forces on 4 June 2017. Upon doing so, they renamed it the "Freedom Dam" (Kurdish: Bendava Azadî;). In 2019, control of the dam was given to the Syrian government after the Turkish invasion of Northern Syria.

See also 

 Lake Assad
 Water resources management in Syria
 List of cities and towns on the Euphrates River

Notes

References 

 
 
 
 

Hydroelectric power stations in Syria
Dams in Syria
Dams on the Euphrates River
Buildings and structures in Raqqa Governorate
Dams completed in 1986
Crossings of the Euphrates